Samuel Adrian Dagley (November 4, 1902 – March 17, 1968) was the head coach for the Gonzaga University men's basketball team for the 1931–32 season. While at Gonzaga, he accrued a record of 4–7 (.364).

References

1902 births
1968 deaths
American men's basketball coaches
Basketball coaches from California
Gonzaga Bulldogs football coaches
Gonzaga Bulldogs men's basketball coaches
Pasadena City College faculty
Players of American football from Pasadena, California
Santa Clara Broncos baseball players
Santa Clara Broncos football players
Santa Clara University faculty
Sportspeople from Pasadena, California